Escuque is one of the 20 municipalities of the state of Trujillo, Venezuela. The municipality occupies an area of 165 km2 with a population of 32,901 inhabitants according to the 2017 census.

Towns

References

Municipalities of Trujillo (state)